Brazilian Americans ( or ) are Americans who are of full or partial Brazilian ancestry. The Brazilian Ministry of Foreign Affairs estimates the Brazilian American population to be 1,775,000, the largest of any Brazilian diaspora. The largest wave of Brazilian migration to the United States occurred in the late 1980s and early 1990s as a response to hyperinflation in Brazil. Even after inflation stabilized in 1994, Brazilian immigration continued as Brazilians left in search of higher wages in the United States.

Population and classification
In 2020, the Brazilian Ministry of Foreign Affairs estimated the number of Brazilian Americans to be 1,775,000, 0.53% of the US population at the time. However, the 2019 United States Census Bureau American Community Survey estimated that there were 499,272 Americans who would report Brazilian ancestry. This discrepancy can be attributed to the American Community Survey reporting on ancestry and not nationality, since many Brazilians by nationality are not ancestrally or ethnically Brazilian.

Brazilians are largely not considered a Hispanic ethnic group, because Brazil is not a Spanish-speaking country. This is reflected in the 1980 census, where only 18% of Brazilian Americans considered themselves Hispanic. In 1976, Congress passed the Hispanic-American Voting Rights Act which mandated the collection and analysis of data of Hispanic Americans. The legislation describes Hispanic Americans as being “Americans who identify themselves as being of Spanish-speaking background and trace their origin or descent from Mexico, Puerto Rico, Cuba, Central America and South America, and other Spanish-speaking countries.” This includes 20 Spanish-speaking nations from Latin America and Spain itself, but not Portugal or Brazil.

Whether or not Brazilians are Latino is controversial among Brazilian Americans. Some attribute this to the large cultural divide between Spanish-speaking Latin America and Brazil. While the official United States census category of Latino includes persons of South American origin, it does not explicitly include Brazilians. Other U.S. government agencies, such as the Small Business Administration and the Department of Transportation, specifically include Brazilians within their definition of Latino for purposes of awarding minority preferences by defining Latino Americans to include persons of South American ancestry or persons who have Portuguese cultural roots.

History 

People from Brazil (from ancient João Pessoa and Recife under Dutch control in Northeast Brazil - Paraíba and Pernambuco states) are recorded among the Refugees and Settlers that arrived in New Netherland in what is now New York City in the 17th century among the Dutch West India Company settlers. The first arrivals of Brazilian emigres were formally recorded in the 1940s. Previously, Brazilians were not identified separately from other South Americans. Of approximately 234,761 South American emigres arrived in the United States between 1820 and 1960, at least some of them were Brazilian. The 1960 United States census report recorded 27,885 Americans of Brazilian ancestry.

From 1960 until the mid-1980s, between 1,500 and 2,300 Brazilian immigrants arrived in the United States each year. During the mid-1980s, economic crisis struck Brazil. As a result, between 1986 and 1990 approximately 1.4 million Brazilians emigrated to other parts of the world. It was not until this time that Brazilian emigration reached significant levels. Thus, between 1987 and 1991, an estimated 20,800 Brazilians arrived in the United States. A significant number of them, 8,133 Brazilians, arrived in 1991. The 1990 U.S. Census Bureau recorded that there are about 60,000 Brazilians living in the United States. However, other sources indicate that there are nearly 100,000 Brazilians living in the New York City metropolitan area (including Northern New Jersey) alone, in addition to sizable Brazilian communities in Atlanta, Boston, Philadelphia, Washington, D.C., Los Angeles, Miami, Orlando, Houston, and Phoenix.

There are many hypothesis regarding the formation of Brazilian migration to the United States. Ana Cristina Martes, a professor of sociology at Fundação Getúlio Vargas Brazil, helped explain the first few migratory trips to the U.S. which took place in Boston. She noticed a series of six events that could have led the cycle of migration:

 During World War II, American engineers from the Boston area traveled to Governador Valadares to work on the region's mineral extraction and railroad. When they came back to the States, many of them brought their Brazilian domestic employees.
 After the war, some Bostonians strengthen the relationship with Valadares [by coming back on more trips for more precious stones].
 In the 1960s, newspapers from Rio [De Janeiro] and São Paulo published a number of ads offering jobs to Brazilian women interested in working as maids in Boston.
 [During the same time period, a business man from Massachusetts] hired twenty soccer players from Belo Horizonte to form a soccer team. Many of them stayed permanently and helped their family join them in the States.
 At the end of the decade, a group of more than ten young people from Governador Valadares decided to come to the States to spend more time on ‘an adventurous trip…in a country of their dreams’. They also settled permanently and helped their families join them.
 Several Brazilians came to study in Boston and decided not to return to Brazil.

Before the 1960s there was insignificant movement from Brazil to the United States. It was between the 1960s through 1980s that some Brazilians went to the United States as tourists to visit places such as Disney World, New York and other tourist destinations. Brazilians traveled during that time because the country was growing at an average 7% annually and projecting 4% annual increase in GDP per capita. After the 1980s, the peak of the economic cycle quickly dropped to a long lasting through. The Brazilian Federal Police reported that in the 1980s about 1.25 million people (1% of the population) emigrated to countries such as the U.S. This was the first time Brazilians emigrated in significant numbers. They wanted to stay in the States until the crisis was over. They also had some work connections and known opportunities in the East Coast, which increased facilitated the move. In 1980, there were 41,000 Brazilians and 82,000 by 1990. Neoclassical Economics Theory explains the beginning flow of migration in 1980 indicating that individuals were rational actors who looked for better opportunities away from home to improve his/her lifestyle. Since the crisis hit the Brazilian middle class hard, many chose to leave to optimize their income, find better jobs, and more stable social conditions by doing marginal benefit analysis.

There was another wave of emigration in 2002 where Brazilian Ministry of Foreign Affairs estimated that 1.96 million Brazilians had left again as the country continued to lack economic stability. This number reflected another 1% of the Brazilian population 22 years later (“Population, total”). This wave of migration was different from the one in the 1980s. As shown by Martes’ research, migration evolved even more with a creation and better establishment of social networks. When Bostonians first brought back a wave of Brazilian domestic workers, Brazilians would send information to their homes about their experiences and opportunities. This connection is what Douglas Massey defined as Social Capital Theory. Migrants create social ties in the host country facilitating the move at lower cost and creating an incentive to join their community in another country. Legal migrants who had entered the U.S. brought their immediate relatives resulting in an increase of the Brazilian immigrant population.

Lawful Permanent Resident Status 

Brazilians obtained the highest number of lawful permanent residence status between 2000 and 2009 and many were eligible to naturalize. During that time, 115,404 Brazilians received permanent status and from 2010 through 2016, already 80,741 persons had received theirs. Still, it seems as if many received status, but if you compare to the total foreign born Brazilian population, the numbers are small. In 2010 the Brazilian foreign born population was 340,000 and only 12,057 (or 4% of) persons obtained legal status. Of the 336,000 foreign born Brazilians in 2014, only 10,246 (or 3%) received permanent status in the same year. Even though few people are obtaining permanent status, there was a noticeable spike previously mentioned between 2000 and 2009. The increase in acceptance was due to two main factors: the 1986 Immigration Reform and Control Act and economic and political turmoil in Brazil.

The top three classes of admissions for Brazilians obtaining lawful permanent status in the U.S. in 2016 was family-sponsored, employment, and immediate relatives of U.S. citizens. Each category of admissions makes up of 4%, 25%, and 68% respectively of the total individuals.

Socioeconomics

Education 
The 2000 U.S. census showed that 34.5 percent of Brazilians in the U.S. had completed four or more years of college, while the corresponding number for the general U.S. population is only 24.4 percent. However, although effectively many Brazilian immigrants in the United States are university educated, most of these immigrants fail to get well-qualified jobs and have to get lower-status jobs because the United States doesn't recognize their qualifications and also because many of them do not speak English.

Second-and third-generation Brazilian Americans tend to have better jobs; they have been educated in the United States, speak English, and have citizenship.

Culture

Religion 
Although the majority of Brazilian Americans are Roman Catholic, there also significant numbers of Protestants (Mainline, Evangelical, Pentecostalism, Non-denominational Protestantism etc.), LDS, Orthodox, Irreligious people (including atheists and agnostics), followed by minorities such as Spiritists, Buddhists, Jews and Muslims.

As with wider Brazilian culture, there is set of beliefs related through syncretism that might be described as part of a Spiritualism–Animism continuum, that includes: Spiritism (or Kardecism, a form of spiritualism that originated in France, often confused with other beliefs also called , distinguished from them by the term ), Umbanda (a syncretic religion mixing African animist beliefs and rituals with Catholicism, Spiritism, and indigenous lore), Candomblé (a syncretic religion that originated in the Brazilian state of Bahia and that combines African animist beliefs with elements of Catholicism), and Santo Daime (created in the state of Acre in the 1930s by Mestre Irineu (also known as Raimundo Irineu Serra) it is a syncretic mix of Folk Catholicism, Kardecist Spiritism, Afro-Brazilian religions and a more recent incorporation of Indigenous American practices and rites). People who profess Spiritism make up 1.3% of the country's population, and those professing Afro-Brazilian religions make up 0.3% of the country's population.

Politics 
Brazilian American voters heavily support the Democratic Party. Majority of Brazilian Americans voted for the Democratic presidential candidates in the 2016 and 2020 elections by 78 and 71 percent, respectively.

Demographics 
Brazilians began immigrating to the United States in large and increasing numbers in the 1980s as a result of worsening economic conditions in Brazil at that time.  However, many of the Brazilians who have emigrated to the United States since this decade have been undocumented. More women have immigrated to the United States from Brazil than men, with the 1990 and 2000 U.S. censuses showing there to be ten percent more female than male Brazilian Americans. The top three metropolitan areas by Brazilian population are New York City (72,635), Boston (63,930), and Miami (43,930).

Racial stereotypes and representation in media
In popular use, Brazilian is often mistakenly given racial values, usually non-white and mixed race, such as half-caste or mulatto, in spite of the racial diversity of Brazilian Americans. Brazilians commonly draw ancestry from European, Indigenous populations, and African populations in different proportions; many Brazilians are largely of European ancestry, and some are predominantly of Native Brazilian Indian origin. However, most Brazilians descend at least partially from African origins as Brazil received the largest amount of African slaves and was the last to abolish slavery. Nonetheless, the majority of Brazilians are descended from an admixture of two, three or more origins, referred to as pardos. Paradoxically, it is common for them to be stereotyped as being exclusively non-white due merely to their Latin background of country of origin, regardless of whether their ancestry is European or not. On the other hand, the white Brazilian Americans who are perceived by Americans as "Brazilian" usually possess typical Mediterranean/Southern European pigmentation - olive skin, dark hair, and dark eyes - as most white Brazilian immigrants are and most white Brazilian Americans are; the same situation happens for Portuguese Americans who are perceived by Americans as such, as most Portuguese immigrants are. Because Americans associate Brazilian origin with brown skin, Hollywood typically casts Brazilian Americans with conventionally Mediterranean features as non-Brazilian white.

Brazilian American communities 

 New York City is a leading point of entry for Brazilians entering the United States. West 46th Street between Fifth and Sixth Avenues in Manhattan has been designated Little Brazil has historically been a commercial center for Brazilians living in or visiting New York City. Another NYC neighborhood home to many Brazilian Americans is located in Astoria, Queens. 
 Newark, New Jersey is home to many Brazilian and Portuguese-Americans, most prominently in the city's Ironbound district.
Massachusetts, particularly the Boston metropolitan area, has a sizable Brazilian immigrant population. Framingham has the highest percentage of Brazilians of any municipality in Massachusetts. Somerville has the highest number of Brazilians of any municipality in Massachusetts. Large populations also exist in Everett, Barnstable, Lowell, Marlborough, Hudson, Malden, Shrewsbury, Worcester, Milford, Fitchburg, Leominster, Falmouth, Revere, Edgartown, Peabody, Lancaster, Dennisport, Chelsea, Lawrence, Vineyard Haven, Oak Bluffs, Millbury, and Leicester.
 Florida's large Brazilian community is mostly centered around the southeastern corridor, particularly the islands and northeastern section of Miami-Dade County (North Bay Village, Bay Harbor Islands, Miami Beach, Surfside, Key Biscayne, Aventura, and Sunny Isles Beach) with the exception of Doral. In Broward County, the population is centered on the northeastern part as well (Deerfield Beach, Pompano Beach, Oakland Park, Coconut Creek, Lighthouse Point, and Sea Ranch Lakes), with some living also in Palm Beach County (Boca Raton). There are also many Brazilians living in Orange County and Osceola County, particularly in the cities of Orlando and Kissimmee.
 Philadelphia, Pennsylvania has a vibrant Brazilian community, mostly settling in the Northeast section of the city, in communities such as Oxford Circle, Summerdale, Frankford, Juniata Park, Lawndale, Fox Chase, and Rhawnhurst. Many of the Brazilian residents started to come to Philadelphia during the early 2000s, opening restaurants, boutiques, supermarkets, and other stores along Bustleton, Castor, and Cottman Avenues.
 Smaller, but highly concentrated Brazilian communities reside in Riverside, Delran, Cinnaminson, Palmyra, Delanco, Beverly, Edgewater Park, and Burlington, all within New Jersey.
 Los Angeles, California's Brazilian residents have tended to settle, if not form distinct ethnic enclaves in, the county's southern beach cities (Venice, Los Angeles; and suburbs of Lawndale; Long Beach; Manhattan Beach; and Redondo Beach) and Westside neighborhoods near and south of the 10 (Palms, Los Angeles; Rancho Park, Los Angeles; and West Los Angeles; and the suburb of Culver City). The city's greatest concentration of Brazilian American businesses began appearing in the late 1980s along Venice Boulevard's north border between Culver City and Palms (between Overland Avenue and Sepulveda Avenue).
 Chicago, Illinois' Brazilian population began with the migration of Portuguese Sephardi Jews who had fled to Brazil during the World War II era. After World War II, many Sephardim successfully circumvented restrictive U.S. immigration laws, to join the large and largely Ashkenazi population in the Chicago area. However, it was not until the 1970s, did a visible Brazilian community begin to develop in Chicago. The Flyers Soccer Club was founded by a group of young men who desired to bring Brazilian soccer culture to the Chicago area. The Flyers Soccer Club eventually transformed into a multifaceted community organization called the Luso-Brazilian Club. The group was headquartered in Chicago's Lakeview neighborhood. The group declined in the late 1980s. As Brazilians emigrated to the United States in large numbers in the 1980s and 1990s, Chicago's Brazilian population remained comparatively small, numbering no more than several thousand people by 2000. The FIFA World Cups have attracted the attention of Chicago's Brazilian population through the years, leading to the development of some Brazilian soccer-interested gatherings in the area.

The top U.S. states by Brazilian ancestry population

The top U.S. counties by Brazilian immigrant population 
The national total being 433,500 persons estimated from the American Community Survey for 2015 - 2019 via the Migration Policy Institute website

1) Middlesex County, Massachusetts -- 34,300

2) Broward County, Florida ------------------- 24,700 

3) Miami-Dade County, Florida ------------- 17,100

4) Orange County, Florida -------------------- 15,800

5) Palm Beach County, Florida ------------- 12,500

6) Los Angeles County, California -------- 11,900

7) Fairfield County, Connecticut ----------- 11,900

8) Essex County, New Jersey --------------- 10,100

9) Worcester County, Massachusetts --- 9,700

10) Suffolk County, Massachusetts ------ 7,500

11) San Diego County, California ----------- 6,100

12) Manhattan Borough, New York -------- 6,000

13) Montgomery County, Maryland -------- 5,700

14) Essex County, Massachusetts --------- 5,600

15) Queens Borough, New York ------------- 5,200

16) Norfolk County, Massachusetts ------ 5,200

17) Harris County, Texas ------------------------ 5,100

18) Westchester County, New York -------- 4,600

19) Cobb County, Georgia ---------------------- 4,600

20) Philadelphia County, Pennsylvania -- 4,500

21) Union County, New Jersey --------------- 4,400

22) King County, Washington ----------------- 4,100

23) Monmouth County, New Jersey ------- 3,900

24) Plymouth County, Massachusetts --- 3,800

25) Orange County, California ---------------- 3,800

26) Cook County, Illinois ------------------------ 3,800

27) Contra Costa County, California ------- 3,600

28) Barnstable County, Massachusetts - 3,600 

U.S. communities with high percentages of people of Brazilian ancestry 
According to ePodunk, a website, the top 50 U.S. communities with the highest percentages of people claiming Brazilian ancestry are:

 North Bay Village, Florida 6.00%
 Riverside, New Jersey 5.00%
 Danbury, Connecticut 4.90%
 Harrison, New Jersey 4.80%
 Framingham, Massachusetts 4.80%
 Somerville, Massachusetts 4.50%
 Kearny, New Jersey 3.70%
 Vineyard Haven, Massachusetts 3.60%
 Deerfield Beach, Florida 3.50%
 Everett, Massachusetts 3.20%
 Marlborough, Massachusetts 3.10%
 Long Branch, New Jersey 2.80%
 Edgartown, Massachusetts 2.70%
 Newark, New Jersey 2.50%
 Doral, Florida 2.50%
 Oak Bluffs, Massachusetts 2.50%
 Miami Beach, Florida 2.20%
 Hillside, New Jersey 2.20%
 Hudson, Massachusetts 2.20%
 Oakland Park, Florida 2.10%
 South River, New Jersey 2.10%
 Cliffside Park, New Jersey2.10%
 Tisbury, Massachusetts 2.10%
 Fairview, New Jersey 2.00%
 Aventura, Florida 1.90%
 Lauramie, Indiana 1.80%
 Revere, Massachusetts 1.70%
 Malden, Massachusetts 1.70%
 Sea Ranch Lakes, Florida 1.70%
 Surfside, Florida 1.60%
 Barnstable, Massachusetts 1.60%
 Lowell, Massachusetts 1.60%
 Ojus, Florida 1.60%
 Washington, Ohio 1.60%
 Naugatuck, Connecticut 1.60%
 Milford, Massachusetts 1.50%
 Dennis Port, Massachusetts 1.50%
 Keene, Texas 1.50%
 Key Biscayne, Florida 1.50%
 Mount Vernon, New York 1.50%
 Avondale Estates, Georgia 1.50%
 Sunny Isles Beach, Florida 1.50%
 Riverside, New Jersey 1.40%
 Trenton, Florida 1.40%
 South Lancaster, Massachusetts 1.30%
 Great River, New York 1.30%
 Port Chester, New York 1.30%
 Coconut Creek, Florida 1.20%
 Belle Isle, Florida 1.20%
 Big Pine Key, Florida 1.20%
 Chelsea, Massachusetts 1.20%

U.S. communities with the most residents born in Brazil

According to the social networking and information website City-Data, the top 25 U.S. communities with the highest percentage of residents born in Brazil are:

 Loch Lomond, Florida 15.8%
 Bonnie Loch-Woodsetter North, Florida 7.2%
 North Bay Village, Florida 7.1%
 East Newark, New Jersey 6.7%
 Framingham, Massachusetts 6.6%
 Harrison, New Jersey 5.8%
 Danbury, Connecticut 5.6%
 Somerville, Massachusetts 5.4%
 Sunshine Ranches, Florida 5.1%
 Flying Hills, Pennsylvania 5.1%
 Deerfield Beach, Florida 4.7%
 Fox River, Alaska 4.5%
 Edgartown, Massachusetts 4.4%
 West Yarmouth, Massachusetts 4.4%
 Marlborough, Massachusetts 4.4%
 Kearny, New Jersey 4.4%
 Doral, Florida 4.1%
 Everett, Massachusetts 4.0%
 Long Branch, New Jersey 3.7%
 Vineyard Haven, Massachusetts 3.4%
 Hudson, Massachusetts 3.2%
 Miami Beach, Florida 3.1%
 Oak Bluffs, Massachusetts 3.0%
 Oakland Park, Florida 3.0%
 Pompano Beach Highlands, Florida 3.0%

Some City-Data information contradicts official government data from the Census Bureau. It is important to be mindful that Brazilian Americans sometimes decline to identify as Latino. Therefore, the above estimates may outnumber the census data figures for Latinos for the above census areas.

Relations with Brazil 

Voting Brazilian Americans and Brazilians abroad heavily favored the opposition's Aecio Neves and his pro-business center to center-right Brazilian Social Democracy Party in Brazil's 2014 general election. Aecio Neves and the Brazilian Social Democracy Party, or PSDB, were narrowly defeated in the 2014 runoff.

Brazilian Americans represent a large source of remittances to Brazil. Brazil receives approximately one quarter of its remittances from the U.S. (26% in 2012), out of a total amount of $4.9 billion received in 2012.

Notable people

Arts
 Andrew Matarazzo, actor 
 Alex Teiso, DJ and Producer
 Barbara Astrini, designer
 Barbie Ferreira, actress
 Bebel Gilberto, singer
 Bill Handel, radio personality
 Blondfire, pop music band
 Bruno Campos, actor
 Camila Mendes, actress
 Camilla Belle, actress
 Carlinhos Pandeiro de Ouro, Percussionist
 Fabrizio Moretti, musician
 Gisele Bündchen, model
 Marcelo Coelho, designer
 Gustavo Assis-Brasil, musician, composer, author
 Jair Oliveira, singer, musician, musical producer and songwriter
 Jared Gomes, rapper and vocalist from Hed PE
 Joe Penna, writer and director
 Jordana Brewster, actress
 Julia Goldani Telles, actress
 Kiko Loureiro, musician, Megadeth and Angra
 Linda Perry, musical producer and songwriter
 Maiara Walsh, actress
 Max Cavalera, musician
 Mônica da Silva, singer, songwriter
 Morena Baccarin, actress
 Sergio Rossetti Morosini, sculptor, painter, author
 Naza, visual artist
 Rudy Mancuso, comedian and Internet personality
 Raw Leiba, actor, producer, director
 Sky Ferreira, singer, songwriter, model, and actress

Sports
 Carlos Lemos Jr, mixed martial artist
 Rafael dos Anjos, mixed martial artist
Rafael Araujo-Lopes, American football player
Bob Burnquist, professional skateboarder
Mackenzie Dern, mixed martial artist
 Benny Feilhaber (born 1985), soccer player
 Gil de Ferran, race car driver and team owner
 Pietro Fittipaldi, Formula One driver
 Yan Gomes, baseball player
 Nenê Hilário, basketball player
 Ryan Hollweg, hockey player
 Louise Lieberman (born 1977), soccer coach and former player
 Dhiego Lima, mixed martial artist
 Douglas Lima, mixed martial artist
Vicente Luque, mixed martial artist
 Scott Machado, basketball player
 Sergio Menezes, footvolley athlete and founder of pro tour
 Amen Santo, Capoeira master.
 Cairo Santos, Chicago Bears placekicker.
 Vic Seixas (born 1923), Hall of Fame former top-10 tennis player
 Anderson Silva, mixed martial artist
 José Leonardo Ribeiro da Silva, soccer player
 Wanderlei Silva, mixed martial artist
Tim Soares (born 1997), basketball player for Ironi Ness Ziona of the Israeli Basketball Premier League
 Isadora Williams, figure skater

Academics
 Ana Maria Carvalho, PhD., professor of linguistics at the Department of Spanish and Portuguese, University of Arizona
 Lin Chao, PhD., professor of ecology at the University of California, San Diego
 Flavia Colgan, political strategist
 Marcelo Gleiser, PhD., physicist and astronomer. Appleton Professor of Natural Philosophy and Professor of Physics and Astronomy at Dartmouth College
 Ben Goertzel, PhD., former professor of Computer Sciences at the University of New Mexico, researcher of artificial intelligence, visiting faculty at Xiamen University
 Miguel Nicolelis, M.D., Ph.D., Duke School of Medicine Distinguished Professor of Neuroscience, Duke University Professor of Neurobiology, Biomedical Engineering and Psychology and Neuroscience, and founder of Duke's Center for Neuroengineering.
 Roberto Mangabeira Unger, LL.M., S.J.D., Roscoe Pound Professor of Law at the Harvard Law School (Harvard University)

Business
David Neeleman, businessman, founder of JetBlue and Azul Brazilian Airlines
 Eduardo Saverin, Facebook co-founder; renounced his U.S. citizenship in 2011

Politics
Gisele Barreto Fetterman, Second Lady of Pennsylvania
Daniel Penha Foganholi, Broward County School Board Member, Florida
George Santos, representative-elect from New York's 3rd congressional district

See also

 American Brazilians
 Portuguese Americans
 Brazilian Day - Brazilian American party of New York
 List of Brazilian Americans
 Brazilian British
 Brazil–United States relations

References

Further reading
  Jefferson, Alphine W. "Brazilian Americans." in Gale Encyclopedia of Multicultural America, edited by Thomas Riggs, (3rd ed., vol. 1, Gale, 2014), pp. 343–355. online
 Jouët-Pastré, Clémence, and Leticia J. Braga. Becoming Brazuca: Brazilian Immigration to the United States (Harvard University David Rockefeller Center for Latin American Studies, 2008).
 Margolis, Maxine L. Little Brazil: An Ethnography of Brazilian Immigrants in New York City (1994).
 Piscitelli, Adriana. “Looking for New Worlds: Brazilian Women as International Migrants.” Signs: Journal of Women in Culture and Society 33#4 (2008): 784–93.

External links
  Centro Cultural Brasil-USA (Brazil-USA Cultural Center)
 The Brazilian-American Foundation
 Brazilian-American Cultural Institute
 Brazilian-American Association
 Brazilian-American Chamber of Commerce, Inc.

 
 
 
Hispanic and Latino American
Multiracial ethnic groups in the United States